Washita National Wildlife Refuge is a National Wildlife Refuge (NWR) of the United States located in Custer County, Oklahoma. Created in 1961 on the shore of Foss Lake, it was the fourth NWR in the state.

Within the refuge, the slow-moving Washita River winds through prairie and cropland to merge with Foss Reservoir, providing a home and resting area for geese and other waterfowl. Gently rolling hills, ravines, and bottomlands laced with creeks shelter wildlife as common as white-tailed deer and as unusual as the Texas horned lizard, a state-listed endangered species.

The United States Fish and Wildlife Service has reported 270 bird species as having been seen in the NWR. These include occasional sightings of the bald eagle and rare sightings of whooping cranes. Outdoor activities allowed in the NWR include birdwatching, boating, hiking, fishing, and limited hunting. Hunting is allowed only in certain seasons and with special permits. Quarry includes deer, geese, sandhill cranes, quail, and rabbits.

References
Refuge website

National Wildlife Refuges in Oklahoma
Protected areas of Custer County, Oklahoma
Protected areas established in 1961
1961 establishments in Oklahoma